The 1992–93 Divizia B was the 53rd season of the second tier of the Romanian football league system.

The format has been changed from three series to only two series, both of them having 18 teams. At the end of the season, the winners of the series promoted to Divizia A and the last two places from both series relegated to Divizia C.

Team changes

To Divizia B
Promoted from Divizia C
 –

Relegated from Divizia A
 Argeș Pitești
 ASA Târgu Mureș
 Corvinul Hunedoara

From Divizia B
Relegated to Divizia C
 Petrolul Ianca
 Aris Arad
 Chimica Târnăveni
 Olimpia Râmnicu Sărat
 Gaz Metan Mediaș
 Electromureș Târgu Mureș
 CS Târgoviște
 UM Timișoara
 Minerul Cavnic
 FEPA 74 Bârlad
 Șoimii IPA Sibiu
 Aripile Bacău
 Caracal
 Metalurgistul Slatina
 Relonul Savinești
 Sportul 30 Decembrie
 Astra Arad
 Borzești

Promoted to Divizia A
 Progresul București
 CSM Reșița
 Universitatea Cluj

League tables

Serie I

Serie II

Top scorers 
9 goals
  Constantin Barbu (Argeș Pitești)

4 goals
  Haralambie Antohi (Gloria CFR Galați)

3 goals
  Gigi Ion (Ceahlăul Piatra Neamț)

See also
 1992–93 Divizia A

References

1990
Rom
2